William Beverly Murphy (June 17, 1907 – May 29, 1994) was an American food businessman. He was the president and CEO of Campbell Soup Company between 1953 and 1972. From 1942 to 1945 he was on leave from Campbell's Soup to the War Production Board. Prior to joining Campbell's Soup he was at the A.C. Nielsen Company (1928–1938) where he is credited with conceiving the idea for the Nielsen Food Index and Nielsen Drug Index Services. Murphy was also a life member emeritus of the MIT Corporation (Massachusetts Institute of Technology).

Life 
Murphy was born in Appleton, Wisconsin and received a Bachelor of Science in chemical engineering from the University of Wisconsin in 1928. He subsequently joined the A.C. Nielsen Company of Chicago and rose to the position of executive vice president. He joined Campbell Soup in 1938 as Assistant to General Manager. Murphy was elected executive vice president of Campbell Soup in 1949 and was president and CEO from 1953 to 1972. Murphy died May 29, 1994 at the age of 86 of pneumonia in a convalescent home in Bryn Mawr, Pennsylvania.

While at Campbell's Soup Company he took the corporation public and increased its brand portfolio to include Pepperidge Farm breads, cookies, and crackers, Franco-American gravies and pastas, V8 juice (vegetable), Swanson broths, and Godiva (chocolatier).

Murphy was a special term member of the MIT Corporation from 1961–65 and a life member from 1965–82. He served on several MIT standing committees, including the Auditing Committee (1984–86), the Executive Committee (1966–72 and 1976–82), and the Membership Committee (1964–67). He was a member of the visiting committees for the Department of Applied Biological Sciences (1985–88), the Department of Nutrition and Food Science (1980–85 and 1974–80 as chairman), the MIT Sloan School of Management (1972–76 and 1965–66, and 1964–65 as chairman), and the School of Industrial Management (1961–63, 1963–64 as chairman and 1959–61 as a presidential nominee).

As head of Campbell Soup, Murphy's managerial style, which prioritized lean manufacturing, fostered conflict with his workers who contested his high production targets. The climax of this conflict occurred in 1968, when the AFL-CIO affiliated locals at the Campbell plants attempted to coordinate their contracts. Murphy firmly opposed the coordinated bargaining across his plants; divisions between the different locals limited their gains, and his managerial vision prevailed.

In 1980, former president and chairman of the MIT Corporation Paul Gray presented Murphy with the Henry Laurence Gantt Memorial Medal. It is awarded jointly by the American Management Associations and the American Society of Mechanical Engineers for "distinguished achievement in management as a service to the community."

In addition to serving on several government advisory panels, Murphy was a director of companies including AT&T, Merck & Co., Inc., and International Paper. He also served as national chairman of Radio Free Europe in 1960–61 and as chairman of the board of trustees of the Nutrition Foundation in 1964–65.

Employment 
 A.C. Nielsen Company (ACNielsen), Chicago, Illinois, 1928–1938
 Executive Vice President, 1935–1938
 Campbell Soup Company, Camden, New Jersey, 1938–1980
 Assistant to General Manager, 1938–1941
 On leave to War Production Board, 1942–1945
 Executive Assistant to President, 1946–1948
 Executive Vice President, 1949–1953
 President and Chief Executive Officer, March 1953 – June 1972
 Director, 1950–1980
 War Production Board, 1942–1945
 Director, Facilities Division

Education 
 Grade School — First Ward School, Appleton, Wisconsin, 1913–1920
 High School — Appleton West High School, 1920–1924
 College — University of Wisconsin, 1924–1928
 B.S. in Chemical Engineering
 Tau Beta Pi (honorary scholastic engineering society)
 Iron Cross (honorary senior activities society)
 Delta Upsilon (social fraternity)
 "W" Club (Major letter winner in track)

Directorships 
 American Telephone & Telegraph Company (AT&T), 1961–1978
 Merck & Co., Inc., 1959–1980
 International Paper, 1969–1980

Charitable and civic activities 
 Wisconsin Alumni Research Foundation
 Trustee, 1958–?
 President, 1982–1986
 Bryn Mawr Presbyterian Church
 Trustee, 1959–1961
 Elder, 1964–1966
 Advance Gifts Chairman, Every member Canvass, 1963–1964
 Co-Chairman, Expanding Ministries and Building Fund Drive, 1964–1965
 Massachusetts Institute of Technology
 Life Member, 1961–1982
 Executive Committee, 1966–1972; 1976–1984
 Chairman, Visiting Committee for School of Nutrition and Food Science, 1975–1976
 Vice Chairman, Development Committee, 1976–1981
 Academy of Natural Sciences
 Trustee, 1968–1976
 Honorary Trustee, 1976–?
 Chairman, Executive Committee, 1974–1976
 Chairman, Search Committee, 1975–1976
 Philadelphia Museum of Art
 Trustee, 1972–?
 Chairman, Capital Development Drive, 1971–1974
 First United Fund Campaign of Camden
 Chairman, 1958
 Greater Camden Movement
 Co-Chairman, 1968–1971
 Blue Hill Memorial Hospital, Blue Hill, Maine
 Member, Investment Committee, 1980–?
 Philadelphia Society for Promoting Agriculture
 President, 1985–1986
 Greater Philadelphia Movement
 Chairman, Committee on Public School Education, 1973–1975
 Greater Philadelphia Partnership, 1976–?
 Afro-American Historical and Cultural Museum, Board of Directors, 1977

Honorary degrees and awards 
 U.S. Presidential Medal for Merit by President Harry S. Truman on recommendation of the Secretary of the Air Force, 1946
 Lawrence University, LLD, 1954
 Widener College (Widener University), LLD, 1960
 University of Wisconsin, LLD, 1963
 St. Joseph's College, LLD 1965
 Ursinus College, Sc.D., 1970
 Drexel University, Sc.D., 1970
 Rutgers University, LHD, 1973
 Fellow — American Association for the Advancement of Science, 1963
 Poor Richard Club Gold Medalist, 1966
 Herbert Hoover Award of National-American Wholesalers Grocers Association, 1966
 Pennsylvania Society Annual Award, 1967
 Supermarket Institute — William H. Albers Award, 1967
 Business Week Citizens Award, 1971
 Distinguished Service Citation College of Engineering, University of Wisconsin, 1957

National organizations 
 Business Council, 1960–?
 Chairman, 1965–1966
 Nutrition Foundation, 1953–1972
 Chairman, 1963–1964
 Chairman, Committee on Program and Staffing, 1970–1971
 Business Roundtable, 1971–1973
 Organized, 1971
 Chairman, 1971–1973
 United Nations University, American Council, 1975–1976

Other activities 
 Radio Free Europe Fund, Chairman, 1960–1961
 Mexican-American Panel on Rural Development — panelist, 1965, sponsored by the National University of Mexico and The Advertising Council (Ad Council)
 National Advisory Commission on Rural Areas Development, 1966
 Colloque Franco-American Delegate, 1966–1967
 President's Advisory Committee on Labor-Management Policy, 1966–1968
 National Advisory Commission on Food and Fiber, 1966–1968
 President's Commission on Postal Organization, 1967–1968
 White House Conference on Food, Nutrition and Health, Chairman, Panel on Traditional Food, 1969
 President's Public Advisory Committee on Trade Policy, 1968–1969
 Member United Nations Association (UNA) — USA National Policy Panel on World Population, 1969
 U.S. Environmental Protection Agency, Hazardous Materials Advisory Committee, 1971–1972
 Woodrow Wilson National Fellowship Foundation, 1973–1974
 National Science Foundation — Northeast Region, Member, Planning Committee, 1978

Family 
 Parents-Stephen Waite and Hilma Anderson Murphy
 Wife-Helen Huston Brennan
 Children-Robert Blair Murphy, Ann M. Zabel, John H. Murphy, Eric S. Murphy

References 

 Greater Prosperity through Marketing Research, The First 40 Years of A. C. Nielsen Company, Arthur C. Nielsen, Sr., The Newcomen Society in North America, 1964.
 Fifty Active Years 1928–1978, An interview by Archie K. Davis with W. B. Murphy on behalf of The Southern Historical Collection of The University of North Carolina, Chapel Hill, North Carolina, 1978.

1907 births
1994 deaths
People from Appleton, Wisconsin
University of Wisconsin–Madison College of Engineering alumni
Radio Free Europe/Radio Liberty people
Campbell Soup Company people
American chief executives of food industry companies
20th-century American businesspeople